Aslan Karatsev won his first ATP Tour singles title, defeating Lloyd Harris in the final, 6–3, 6–2 to win the men's singles tennis title at the 2021 Dubai Tennis Championships. Karatsev became the second wildcard in the tournament's history to win the men's singles title. Harris was the first qualifier to reach the final of the Dubai Tennis Championships.

Novak Djokovic was the defending champion, but chose not to participate.

Seeds
All seeds receive a bye into the second round. 

The players who also received a bye into the second round were as follows, each semifinalist from Doha or Marseille:
  Nikoloz Basilashvili
  Matthew Ebden

The other six byes were removed, and six players were added to the main draw.

Draw

Finals

Top half

Section 1

Section 2

Bottom half

Section 3

Section 4

Qualifying

Seeds

Qualifiers

Lucky losers

Qualifying draw

First qualifier

Second qualifier

Third qualifier

Fourth qualifier

Fifth qualifier

Sixth qualifier

References

External links
 Main draw
 Qualifying draw

Men's Singles
2021 ATP Tour